Monitoring as a service (MaaS) is one of many cloud computing delivery models under anything as a service (XaaS). It is a framework that facilitates the deployment of monitoring functionalities for various other services and applications within the cloud. The most common application for MaaS is online state monitoring, which continuously tracks certain states of applications, networks, systems, instances or any element that may be deployable within the cloud.

References

 
 
 
 

Cloud computing
As a service